Arohana, Arohanam or Aroha, in the context of Indian classical music, is the ascending scale of notes in a raga. The pitch increases as we go up from Shadja (Sa) to the Taar Shadja (Sa), possibly in a crooked (vakra) manner.

Scale
In Hindustani classical music, the ascending scale's notes are S R G M P D and N. Lower forms of  notes are written in lower case, like r g m d n (S and P are fixed notes), while the first scale given above is that of higher form of the notes. The English notes C D E F G A and B correspond to S R G M P D and N, when C is taken as the tonal note (S is sung at C).

In Carnatic music, the ascending scale's notes for the variant notes R G M D and N have a subscript number indicating the specific variant (see examples below).

Examples

In Multani, the aroha is 'N S g M P N S' (lowercase notes are the lower forms, while uppercase notes are the higher forms, and an apostrophe preceding or following a note denotes the lower or higher octave – see swara).

In Sankarabharanam ragam (29th Melakarta in 72 parent ragam scheme of Carnatic music) the Arohana is S R2 G3 M1 P D2 N3 S. See swaras in Carnatic music for explanation of notation.

In Abhogi ragam, which is a janya ragam of 22nd melakarta Kharaharapriya, the Arohana is S R2 G2 M1 D2 S. In this ragam certain notes are excluded so the raga is totally changed.

References

Carnatic music terminology
Hindustani music terminology
Ragas